Marcus Vettius Bolanus was a Roman senator active during the reign of Trajan. He was eponymous consul for AD 111 as the colleague of Gaius Calpurnius Piso. He is thought to have been the son of Marcus Vettius Bolanus, consul in 66. The poet Statius mentions his brother Crispus.

References

Further reading 
 E. Sattmann, "Vettius (26)", Realencyclopädie der classischen Altertumswissenschaft, vol. VIII, A-2, (Stuttgart, 1958), col. 1858

2nd-century Romans
Imperial Roman consuls
Bolanus